HD 139319 is a ternary system composed of the binary Algol variable star known as TW Draconis, and a main-sequence companion star at a separation of 3 arcseconds.

System 
The primary star is an eclipsing, semi-detached binary, the brighter component of which is a pulsating star of Delta Scuti type. Its pulsation frequency is 17.99 cycles per day. Mass transfer between stars is ongoing in the system with a transfer rate of 6.8×10−7/year. The 2.8 day period of the Algol binary is cyclically variable with a period 116.04 years, possibly due to gravitational influence of the distant companion HD 139319B. Another three stars in the system are suspected.

References 

3
Draco (constellation)
J15335104+6354257
BD+64 1077
076196
139319
G-type main-sequence stars
K-type main-sequence stars
Algol variables
Draconis, TW